Erling Schroeder (1 March 1904 – 17 October 1989), was a Danish film actor.

Filmography
I kantonnement – 1932
Han, hun og Hamlet – 1932
Med fuld musik – 1933
Københavnere – 1933
Fem raske piger – 1933
 Flight from the Millions – 1934
En lille tilfældighed – 1939
Sørensen og Rasmussen – 1940
Jeg har elsket og levet – 1940
Alle går rundt og forelsker sig – 1941
En søndag på Amager – 1941
Som du vil ha' mig – 1943
Jeg mødte en morder – 1943
Otte akkorder – 1944
En ny dag gryer – 1945
I går og i morgen – 1945
Lykke på rejsen – 1947
Tre piger i Paris – 1963
Og så er der bal bagefter – 1970
Nu går den på Dagmar – 1972

1904 births
1989 deaths
Danish male film actors
Danish male actors
People from Frederiksberg
20th-century Danish male actors